Neoglocianus is a genus of beetles belonging to the family Curculionidae.

The species of this genus are found in Central Europe.

Species:
 Neoglocianus maculaalba (Herbst, 1795)

References

Curculionidae
Curculionidae genera